Odaxothrissa, the fangtooth pellonulines, is a genus of fresh-water fish in the herring family, Clupeidae.  There are currently three recognized species in this genus, all of which are found in tropical Africa.

Species
 Odaxothrissa ansorgii Boulenger, 1910 (Ansorge fangtooth pellonuline)
 Odaxothrissa losera Boulenger, 1899 (Losera fangtooth pellonuline)
 Odaxothrissa mento (Regan, 1917) (Nigerian fangtooth pellonuline) (=  Odaxothrissa vittata Regan, 1917)

References

 

Clupeidae
Fish of Africa
Freshwater fish genera
Taxa named by George Albert Boulenger